The 2015–16 Nevada Wolf Pack men's basketball team represented the University of Nevada, Reno during the 2015–16 NCAA Division I men's basketball season. The Wolf Pack, led by first year head coach Eric Musselman, played their home games at the Lawlor Events Center and were members of the Mountain West Conference. They finished the season 24–14, 10–8 in Mountain West play to finish in a tie for fourth place. They defeated New Mexico in the quarterfinals of the Mountain West tournament to advance to the semifinals where they lost to San Diego State. They were invited to the College Basketball Invitational where they defeated Montana, Eastern Washington, and Vermont to advance to the best-of-three finals series against Morehead State. They defeated Morehead State 2 games to 1 to become the CBI champions.

Previous season
The Wolf Pack finished season 9–22, 5–13 in Mountain West play to finish in tenth place. They lost in the first round of the Mountain West tournament to UNLV. At the end of the season, head coach David Carter was fired. He compiled a record of 98–97 in six seasons.

Departures

Incoming transfers

Recruiting

Roster

Schedule

|-
!colspan=9 style="background:#002E62; color:#C8C9CB;"| Exhibition

|-
!colspan=9 style="background:#002E62; color:#C8C9CB;"| Non-conference regular season

|-
!colspan=9 style="background:#002E62; color:#C8C9CB;"| Mountain West regular season

|-
!colspan=9 style="background:#002E62; color:#C8C9CB;"| Mountain West tournament

|-
!colspan=9 style="background:#002E62; color:#C8C9CB;"| CBI

References

Nevada Wolf Pack men's basketball seasons
Nevada
Nevada
College Basketball Invitational championship seasons
Nevada Wolf Pack
Nevada Wolf Pack